Girls Nite Out is the debut studio album by American contemporary R&B singer Tyler Collins; released October 20, 1989 via RCA Records. The album peaked at #85 on the Billboard 200 and #22 on the Billboard R&B chart in 1990.

Three singles were released from the album: "Whatcha Gonna Do", "Girls Nite Out" and "Second Chance". "Girls Nite Out" was the most successful single from the album, peaking at #6 on the Billboard Hot 100 in 1990.

Track listing

Charts

Weekly charts

Year-end charts

References

External links
 
 

1989 debut albums
RCA Records albums
Tyler Collins (singer) albums